Arab Democratic Party may refer to:

Arab Democratic Party (Lebanon)
Arab Democratic Party (Israel)
Arab Democratic Nasserist Party
Arabic Democratic Unionist Party